The two-stage 2010 MLS Re-Entry Draft took place on December 8, 2010 and December 15, 2010. The Stage 1 Draft of the Re-Entry Process took place on Wednesday, December 8, at 2 p.m. ET via teleconference. The Stage 2 Draft took place on Wednesday, December 15, at 2 p.m. ET. All 18 clubs had a representative participate.

Both Stage 1 and Stage 2 Drafts were conducted in the same order as the traditional Waiver Draft, with Vancouver selecting 17th and Portland selecting 18th.

If a player was not selected in either stage of the Re-Entry Process, that player became available on a first-come, first-served basis to all clubs.

Available Players
The following players were required to meet age and service requirements to participate as stipulated by the terms of the new Collective Bargaining Agreement.  Base salary figures for 2010 are from the MLS Players Union.

Stage One
The Stage 1 Draft of the Re-Entry Process took place on Wednesday, December 8, at 2 p.m. ET via teleconference. Each club could either select a player from the eligible player list, or pass. Once a team passed, it could no longer participate in that stage of the Re-Entry Process. Stage 1 continued until all 18 clubs have passed on the available players.  The only selections in Stage 1 were Joseph Ngwenya (selected by D.C. United) and Aaron Hohlbein (selected by Columbus Crew).
  
Clubs must exercise the option for, or extend a Bona Fide Offer to, players selected in Stage 1. Players that were out of contract may either accept or reject the Bona Fide Offer. Should a player reject the offer, the drafting club will hold the right of first refusal for that player in MLS. Players with option years left on their contract will automatically be added to the drafting club's roster. A Bona Fide Offer must include a first year salary at least equal to 2010 annual base salary and, for players age 30 with 8 years or more of MLS experience, at least equal to 5% greater than their 2010 annual base salary.  Option years (1+1) must be included with salaries increasing by at least 5% each year.

Any player selected in Stage 1 will remain on the drafting Club's 2011 budget at the option price or Bona Fide Offer price until April 1, 2011. Clubs and players may not mutually renegotiate that price to a lower number until April 1, 2011.

Clubs may not select their own players in Stage 1. Players will have the opportunity to negotiate contracts and sign with their previous clubs after Stage 1 is complete through 2 p.m. ET on December 13. Jovan Kirovski was the only player to withdraw from re-entry consideration after Stage 1. Kirovski negotiated a new deal with his current club, the Los Angeles Galaxy.

Stage One, Round One

Stage One, Round Two

Stage Two
The Stage 2 Draft took place on Wednesday, December 15, at 2 p.m. ET. Each club could either select a player from the eligible player list or pass. Once a team passed, they could no longer participate in that stage of the Re-Entry Process. The stage continued until all 18 clubs passed on the available players.

In Stage 2, clubs could select from players that were under contract and those not under contract. If a player is not under contract, the drafting club was required to make a genuine offer to the player within seven days. In the event that an agreement could not be reached between the drafting club and an out-of-contract player, the drafting club held the right of first refusal for that player in MLS. Clubs could select their own players in Stage 2 only after all other clubs have declined to select those players.

Stage Two, Round One

Round 1 trades

Stage Two, Round Two

Stage Two, Round Three

References

Categories 

Major League Soccer drafts
Mls Re-entry Draft, 2010
2011 Major League Soccer season
MLS Re-Entry Draft